The Minas Gerais Volleyball Championship is the top level men's and women's volleyball competition in Minas Gerais, Brazil. The first edition happened in 1934 and it has been disputed yearly, with some interruptions. The tournament was initially organized by the Minas Gerais Association of General Sports (AMEG). The Minas Gerais Volleyball Federation was founded in 1942, and has organized all editions since then.

The format and number of participating clubs has varied along the years, and differ between the men's and women's tournament. Though the championship concerns to volleyball teams from Minas Gerais, eventually teams from other states have competed. The 2014 edition has four participants on the men's competition and five on the women's competition. The current version is considered to be a preparation event for the Brazilian Men's and Women's Superleagues.

Men's tournament

Results by Year

Titles per Team

Women's tournament

Results by Year

Titles per Team

References

Volleyball competitions in Brazil
Recurring sporting events established in 1934